Pavail Gulati is an Indian actor who primarily works in Hindi films and web shows. Pavail Gulati is best known for his portrayal in films Thappad (2020) and  Dobaaraa (2022). He is also known for his role in the television-series Yudh (2014) and Haq Se (2018).

Early life
Gulati was born and brought up in New Delhi. He went to school at Blue Bells while attending summer workshops at the National School Of Drama and also learnt dance with Shiamak Davar. He joined Whistling Woods as one of the first students at the faculty.

Career
Pavail started his career as an assistant casting director in My Name Is Khan and made his acting debut with the film Hide & Seek in 2010. He then made his TV debut with Yudh in 2014 portraying Amitabh Bachchan's son. He then appeared in the short film Queen of Hearts in 2016.

In 2017, he made his web debut with Pyaar on the Rocks and also appeared in the film Ittefaq opposite Sonakshi Sinha. He then appeared in Imtiaz Ali's short film The Other Way opposite Shreya Chaudhary and in the web series Haq Se opposite Parul Gulati in 2018.

Gulati portrayed a journalist in Kalank and appeared in an episode of Made in Heaven, both in 2019. In 2020, he appeared in Anurag Kashyap's Segment in Ghost Stories and portrayed an Army Officer in the web series Avrodh: The Siege Within.

Gulati portrayed Taapsee Pannu's husband in the 2020 film Thappad. The film based on domestic violence, proved as a major turning point in his career. It received mixed to positive reviews from critics.

In 2022, he appeared in the short film Flow, in Dobaaraa as Anay opposite Pannu, in Goodbye alongside Rashmika Mandanna and Bachchan, and in web series Faadu opposite Saiyami Kher.

In the media
Gulati ranked 19th in The Times Most Desirable Man List of 2020.

Filmography

Films

Television

Web series

Music videos

References

External links

 
 

Living people

Year of birth missing (living people)

Indian male film actors

Male actors in Hindi cinema

21st-century Indian male actors